Workington is a civil parish and a town in the Borough of Allerdale in Cumbria, England.  It contains 58 listed buildings that are recorded in the National Heritage List for England.  Of these, one is listed at Grade I, the highest of the three grades, seven are at Grade II*, the middle grade, and the others are at Grade II, the lowest grade.  Workington is a port, and its industries in the past have been based on coal mining and steel making.  There is a great variety in types of listed buildings.  Most of them are houses and associated structures and shops. They also include churches, a fortified house now a ruin, a museum and theatre, public houses, hotels, clubs, a school, a bridge, memorials, and a model farm.  There are also remaining industrial buildings.


Key

Buildings

References

Citations

Sources

Lists of listed buildings in Cumbria
Listed